Đặng Văn Trâm (born 2 January 1995) is a Vietnamese footballer who plays as a Midfielders for V.League 1 club Bình Định.

Career
He transferred to Viettel and is competing in V.League 2.

Honours

Club
Viettel
V.League 2
 Runners-up :  2016

References 

1995 births
Living people
Vietnamese footballers
Association football midfielders
Viettel FC players
Binh Dinh FC players
V.League 2 players
V.League 1 players